Andreina Pagnani (born Andreina Gentili; 24 November 1906 – 22 November 1981) was an Italian actress and voice actress.

Biography
Born in Rome and the daughter of a dresser, at a young age Pagnani studied the harp and the piano, then she devoted herself to theatre and then entering the stage companies Artistica Operaia e Giovanni Emanuel. In a short time Pagnani became a primadonna of Italian theater, working among others with Totò, Gino Cervi, Gabriele Ferzetti, Lauretta Masiero.

She made her film debut in 1924, in the silent film L'osteria di Mozzadita. Her film activity was long but very irregular, and almost entirely consisting of supporting roles. She obtained a large popularity as the Maigret's wife in the TV series Le inchieste del commissario Maigret, broadcast on RAI from 1964 to 1972.

Pagnani was also very active as a voice actress and a dubber. She dubbed actresses such as Marlene Dietrich, Bette Davis, Rhonda Fleming, Gloria Swanson, Katharine Hepburn, Barbara Stanwyck, Greta Garbo, Ginger Rogers and many more. She was among the earliest of Italy’s prominent dub actresses along with Lydia Simoneschi, Rosetta Calavetta, Giovanna Scotto and Tina Lattanzi.

Personal life
In 1927, Pagnani was married to the aviator Federico Franco Pagnani until he died in a plane crash in 1933. She also dated actor Alberto Sordi for nine years, who was nearly 14 years her junior.

Filmography

Cinema
 Mese mariano (1929)
 Patatrac (1931) 
 Acqua cheta (1933) - Anita
 Il presidente della Ba.Ce.Cre.Mi. (1933) - Signorina Rossi 
 La maestrina (1934) - Maria Bini, la maestrina 
 Quella vecchia canaglia (1934) - Susanna 
 Il serpente a sonagli (1935) - Sonia 
 Orizzonte dipinto (1941) 
 Apparizione (1943) - Zia Ortensia
 Caccia all'uomo (1948) - Suor Simplicia
 La nemica (1952) - Duchessa Anna di Nemi (Voice, Uncredited)
 Concert of Intrigue (1954) - Elisabetta Tabor || (Voice, Uncredited)
 Il padrone sono me (1955) - La signora Maria 
 Io, Caterina (1957)
 Domenica è sempre domenica (1958) - Countess Clotilde Landolfi Ferretti 
 Call Girls of Rome (1960) - Arabella 
 Le pillole di Ercole (1960) - Giovanna 
 The Lovemakers (1961) - Maîtresse (Voice, Uncredited)
 The Last Judgment (1961) - Guest of Matteoni 
 The Commandant (1963) - Francesca Cavalli 
 I 2 vigili (1967) - Herself (Uncredited)

References

External links 

 

1906 births
1981 deaths
Actresses from Rome
Italian film actresses
Italian stage actresses
Italian television actresses
Italian voice actresses
20th-century Italian actresses